Rob Barraco is an American keyboardist.  Born and raised on Long Island, NY, he has played with Phil Lesh and Friends, The Dead, Dark Star Orchestra, Chris Robinson & New Earth Mud, the Zen Tricksters, Red Flannel Hash, and The Dragonflys.  He was the permanent keyboardist for Phil Lesh and Friends from 2000 to 2003 and has been in the band's line-up at other times.  He also played keyboards (alongside Jeff Chimenti) when ex-members of The Grateful Dead reformed as The Other Ones (in 2002), and then as The Dead (in 2003).

Rob has played music on both keyboard and guitar since the age of 6 and has been a professional musician all his adult life. For over ten years in the 1980s and early 1990s he was keyboardist for the popular The Cosby Show and its spin-off, A Different World. Rob toured with R&B performer Freddie Jackson in the late 1980s before joining The Zen Tricksters. Rob spent eleven years touring and recording with The Tricksters, turning out two studio albums and playing live shows across the US and Canada. Their second album, A Love Surreal, brought the band to the attention of Grateful Dead bassist Phil Lesh, who summoned Rob and Trickster guitarist Jeff Mattson to play a series of shows in San Francisco and then on to tour the country double billing with Bob Dylan. That band included drummer  John Molo and Allman Brothers Band guitarists Derek Trucks and Warren Haynes. The following year Barraco became a member of the Phil Lesh Quintet, including Lesh, Barraco, Molo, Haynes, and guitarist Jimmy Herring. Known by fans as "The Q", the Quintet went on to tour the United States for three years and put out one studio album, There and Back Again. In 2002, Barraco joined with the original members of the Grateful Dead for two shows at the Alpine Valley Music Theater, and then toured with them as The Other Ones in 2002 and 2003. In 2004, he joined Chris Robinson's New Earth Mud. In 2005, Barraco toured with Dark Star Orchestra after the death of keyboardist Scott Larned and continues to play with them at the present time, although he also played sporadically with Phil Lesh and Friends in 2005 and continuously through 2006. Rob has also collaborated with Grateful Dead lyricist Robert Hunter on seven songs recorded on his 2007 solo release, When We All Come Home.

Discography

The Zen Tricksters
The Holy Fool, 1997
A Love Surreal, 1999
For Rex: The Black Tie Dye Ball -  The Zen Tricksters w/ Donna Godchaux, Mickey Hart, Tom Constanten, David Nelson, Michael Falzarano, Rob Barraco, 2006

Phil Lesh and Friends
There And Back Again, 2002
Live at the Warfield, 2006
Instant Live Summer Tour, 2006

The Dead
Summer Getaway, 2003

Gov't Mule
The Deep End, Vol. 2, 2002

Rob Barraco
When We All Come Home, 2007

References

External links
Dark Star Orchestra
 Phil Lesh and Friends
 The Dead
 The Zen Tricksters
 Gov't Mule

American rock keyboardists
Living people
The Other Ones members
21st-century American keyboardists
Year of birth missing (living people)
Dark Star Orchestra members